Open Cyber University (OCU) is a consortium of Korean universities. It was founded in 1997 and is considered as the largest Korean academic exchange university as of 2012 with 35 member universities. The organization is authorized by South Korea's Ministry of Education to offer bachelor's degree in various fields of industry. It offers courses for subjects such as World English.

References

External links
 Official website 

Educational institutions established in 1997
Universities and colleges in South Korea
Distance education institutions based in Asia
1997 establishments in South Korea